The 1991–92 Wessex Football League was the sixth season of the Wessex Football League. The league champions for the first time were Wimborne Town. There was no promotion or relegation this season.

For sponsorship reasons, the league was known as the Jewson Wessex League.

League table
The league consisted of one division of 19 clubs, reduced from 20 the previous season after Havant Town joined the Southern League. No new clubs joined.

References

Wessex Football League seasons
9